The 2016–17 USC Upstate Spartans women's basketball team will represent the University of South Carolina Upstate in the 2016–17 NCAA Division I women's basketball season. The Spartans, led by twelfth year head coach Tammy George, played their games at G. B. Hodge Center and were members of the Atlantic Sun Conference. They finished the season 9–21, 2–12 in A-Sun play to finish in last place. They lost in the quarterfinals of A-Sun Tournament to Stetson.

Media
All home games and conference road will be shown on ESPN3 or A-Sun.TV. Non conference road games will typically be available on the opponents website.

Roster

Schedule

|-
!colspan=9 style="background:#085435; color:#ffffff;"| Non-conference regular season

|-
!colspan=9 style="background:#085435; color:#ffffff;"| Atlantic Sun regular season

|-
!colspan=9 style="background:#085435; color:#ffffff;"| Atlantic Sun Women's Tournament

See also
 2016–17 USC Upstate Spartans men's basketball team

References

USC Upstate
USC Upstate Spartans women's basketball seasons
USC Upstate
USC Upstate